The Ottoman Empire at least nominally ruled Mount Lebanon from its conquest in 1516 until the end of World War I in 1918.

The Ottoman sultan, Selim I (1516–20), invaded Syria and Lebanon in 1516. The Ottomans, through the Maans, a great Druze feudal family, and the Shihabs, a Sunni Muslim family that had converted to Christianity, ruled Lebanon until the middle of the nineteenth century.

Ottoman administration, however, was only effective in urban areas, while most of the country was ruled by tribal chieftains, based largely on their ability to collect taxes for the sultan. The system of administration in Lebanon during this period is best described by the Arabic word iqta', which refers to a political system, similar to other feudal societies, composed of autonomous feudal families that were subservient to the emir, who himself was nominally loyal to the sultan; therefore, allegiance depended heavily upon personal loyalty. The Ottoman Empire also provided minority religious communities autonomy through the millet system to the extent that they could regulate themselves, while recognizing the supremacy of the Ottoman administration.

It was precisely this power structure, made up of fiefdoms, that allowed Bashir II, an emir from the Shihab dynasty in the Druze and Maronite districts of Mount Lebanon, to gain lordship over Mount Lebanon in Ottoman Syria during the first part of the 19th century. It was during this period that Bashir II became an ally of Muhammad Ali who tried to secure Egyptian rule in Mount Lebanon. This was also a period that saw increasing class and sectarian antagonisms that would define Lebanese social and political life for decades to come. The partition of Mount Lebanon into Maronite and Druze provinces raised animosities between the different sects, backed by European powers. This ultimately culminated in the 1860 massacre. After these events, an international commission of France, Britain, Austria, and Prussia intervened. The Ottoman Empire implemented administrative and judicial changes.

Ottoman rule 1516-1918 
The Ottoman Empire was marked by diversity in which communities lived parallel lives. Religious affiliation proved to be a cornerstone in the way the Ottoman state designated and discriminated between its people. The superiority of Islam played a central role in imperial ideology, but this was not a central tenet of what it meant to be "Ottoman". Instead, a central tenet of subjects was to subordinate to the House of Osman. The important aspect of chieftains was their ability to collect taxes for the Empire. This administration is also referred to as iqta''', meaning that autonomous feudal families served the emir, who in turn served the sultan in Istanbul. Personal loyalty played an important role in this allegiance. The House of Osman regarded the absolute sovereignty of the Ottoman ruler as crucial to maintain an Empire that included many different communities. These communities included, among others, Ashkenazi, Syrians, Maronites, Copts, Armenians, and Jews. These communities had to obey the Ottoman fiscal system; in return they received religious and civil autonomy. However, in society it was evident that Islamic law and control were dominant.
Christians and Jews were considered dhimmis, meaning they were perceived as inferior, but also non-Muslim and safeguarded. Although discrimination was pervasive in the Empire, non-Muslim communities went to court for legal issues and were subsequently motivated to establish themselves as self-determining communities. This millet'' legal system was an integral part of the Empire and sustained Ottoman imperial rule over diverse peoples through legal protection of autonomous confessional communities. Until the nineteenth century, different communities were not explicitly tied to political belonging.

Ottoman conquest 

The Ottoman sultan, Selim I (1512–20), after defeating the Safavids, conquered the Mamluks of Egypt. His troops, invading Syria, destroyed Mamluk resistance in 1516 at the Battle of Marj Dabiq, north of Aleppo.

Maan family rule

Shihab dynasty

Bashir II 

At the start of the nineteenth century, Bashir Shihab II, also referred to as Bashir II or the Red Emir, was given lordship over Mount Lebanon. Bashir II was a Christian emir when he received his lordship, since his family converted from Islam to Christianity a century before. This was not considered problematic in the Empire under Islamic rule and dominion. Instead, the focus lay on Bashir II's subordination to the House of Osman and controlling the hinterland as a legitimate ruler, bringing in revenues for the Empire.

The reign of Bashir II saw an economic shift in the mountain regions from a feudal to a cash crop system, in which Beiruti merchants (largely Sunni and Christian) loaned money to peasants, freeing them from dependence on their feudal mountain lords and contributing to the development of a handicraft economy with the growing specialization of agriculture.

The emir's relationship with Muhammad Ali, the Albanian-Ottoman viceroy of Egypt, began in 1821 after Bashir II was forced to seek refuge in Egypt by revolting Maronites upset about over taxation. In 1822, the emir returned to Lebanon, backed by Muhammad Ali, and re-established his semi-autonomous rule, making allies with Maronite patriarchs and surrounding himself with Christians, causing many historians to retrospectively accuse the emir of fomenting religious tensions between the ascendant Maronite community and the historically dominant Druze.

Al-Saghir dynasty

Lebanon under Egyptian occupation
After the failure to put down the insurrection in some of the Greek provinces of the Ottoman Empire due to the intervention of European powers sinking his naval fleet at the Battle of Navarino, the wāli of Egypt, Muhammad Ali, sought the province of Syria. Muhammad Ali believed that Syria was promised as a prize for helping the Greeks, but Sultan Mahmud disagreed and only appointed him the pashalik of Crete. Muhammad Ali raised an army under his son Ibrahim Pasha to occupy the province and bring it under Egyptian control. Bashir II had sought refuge in Egypt during the aforementioned troubled times in Lebanon from 1821 to 1822 and had become an ally of Muhammad Ali, thus his help was sought to help secure Egyptian rule in the province. During the occupation, Ibrahim Pasha and Bashir II enacted high taxes, eventually producing resistance, and Bashir II's provision of Christian forces in battles against the Druze may have served as a source of future sectarian tensions. Bashir II had previously attempted to not appear as favoring the Maronites to the degree that he was required to under the Egyptian occupation, however as his help was required to hold the territory, Muhammad Ali was insistent that he provide forces to his son, even threatening Bashir II personally when he appeared to be hesitating in bringing his soldiers. The occupation also introduced social measures that raised the legal rights of Christians in the area and imposed conscription and disarmament.

Sectarian conflict

1840 conflict in Mount Lebanon 
The relationship between the Druze and Christians has been characterized by harmony and peaceful coexistence, with amicable relations between the two groups prevailing throughout history.

On 3 September 1840, Bashir III was appointed amir of Mount Lebanon by the Ottoman sultan. Geographically, Mount Lebanon represents the central part of present-day Lebanon, which historically has had a Christian majority. Greater Lebanon, on the other hand, created at the expense of Greater Syria, was formally constituted under the League of Nations mandate granted to France in 1920 and includes the Biqa Valley, Beirut, southern Lebanon (up to the border with modern Israel), and northern Lebanon (up to the border with Syria). In practice, the terms Lebanon and Mount Lebanon tend to be used interchangeably by historians until the formal establishment of the Mandate.

Bitter conflicts between Maronites and Druzes, which had been simmering under Ibrahim Pasha's rule, resurfaced under the new amir. Hence, the sultan deposed Bashir III on 13 January 1842, and appointed Omar Pasha as governor of Mount Lebanon. This appointment, however, created more problems than it solved. In Mount Lebanon, France and Britain formed relationships with Maronite and Druze leaders respectively. While the Maronite and Druze communities remained subordinate to the House of Osman, they considered France and Britain to be their protectors. European powers took an Orientalist perspective to understand the dynamics in Mount Lebanon. British dispatches show that they incorrectly understood disputes between communities as stemming from tribal roots, without rational, which was a continuity of an ancestral conflict between the two groups. The French and British assumed that the Ottoman Empire was supporting and promoting Islamic animosity towards Christians. According to them, by creating conflict between Druze and Maronite communities, the Ottoman Empire could increase its dominance over the hinterland. However, the Ottoman Empire was struggling to control Mount Lebanon. Britain and France aimed to separate it into two provinces, one which was Druze territory and the other which was Maronite territory. On 7 December 1842, the sultan adopted the proposal and asked Assad Pasha, the governor (wali) of Beirut, to divide the region, then known as Mount Lebanon, into two districts: a northern district under a Christian deputy governor and a southern district under a Druze deputy governor. This arrangement came to be known as the Double Qaimaqamate. Both officials were to be responsible to the governor of Sidon, who resided in Beirut. The Beirut-Damascus highway was the dividing line between the two districts.

This partition raised tensions, because Druze lived in Maronite territory and Maronites lived in Druze territory. At the same time, the Maronites and Druze communities fought for dominance in Mount Lebanon. Animosities between the religious sects increased, nurtured by outside powers. The French, for example, supported the Maronites, while the British supported the Druzes, and the Ottomans fomented strife to increase their control. Not surprisingly, these tensions led to conflict between Christians and Druzes as early as May 1845. Consequently, the European powers requested that the Ottoman sultan establish order in Lebanon, and he attempted to do so by establishing a majlis (council) in each of the districts. Each majlis was composed of members who represented the different religious communities and was intended to assist the deputy governor.

This system failed to keep order when the peasants of Keserwan, overburdened by heavy taxes, rebelled against the feudal practices that prevailed in Mount Lebanon. In 1858 Tanyus Shahin and Abou Samra Ghanem, both Maronite peasant leaders, demanded that the feudal class abolish its privileges. When this demand was refused, the poor peasants revolted against the shaykhs of Mount Lebanon, pillaging the shaykhs' land and burning their homes.

Mount Lebanon Mutasarrifate 
The division of Lebanon in two different religious communities mostly dissatisfied the Druze minority. Complaining about their lack of political and economic privileges. These factors and other factors led in to violent religious conflicts, eventually leading to the massacre of about 11.000 Maronites and the displacement of 100.000 as well as Greek Orthodox and Greek Catholics in 1860. Creating an opportunity for European powers to intervene in the region.  
 
When the news of the massacres reached Europe, especially France was horrified, and called for action to stop the massacre of the ‘innocent’ Christians. A series of international conventions known as the Règlement Organique were held. In July 1860 a conference in the name of humanity was held in Paris composed of France, Britain, Austria, Prussia, Russia and the Ottoman Empire. A protocol was adopted that provided for 12.000 soldiers from European countries (6000 of which French) to be dispatched to the region. The mandate was to ‘punish the guilty, secure reparations for the Christian losses and suggest reforms that would ensure order and security’. However, Fuad Pasha, the Ottoman official tasked with restoring order on Ottoman behalf, was able repress the violence before the arrival of the European forces.

On 5 October 1860, the participating nations reached an agreement on regional reforms. A new system of autonomy was found, known as the Mount Lebanon Mutasarrifiyya (governorate). Mount Lebanon was separated from Syria and gained new autonomy under a non-Lebanese Christian mutasarrif (governor) supported by an administrative council composed of twelve Lebanese locals, consisting out of members from the Lebanese religious communities (Druze, Greek Orthodox, Maronites, Greek Catholic, Sunni and Shia). 

Mount Lebanon enjoyed now privileges not granted to other (bordering) districts in the region: The Mutasarrifiyya did not pay taxes to the central government; inhabitants were exempted from military service; law enforcement consisted of and was controlled by locals only; except for the governor, every official was a local and the official language of the administration was Arabic.  However, Mount Lebanon had little arable lands. Now that the Mutasarrifiyya became more autonomous, it became dependent on neighboring districts for food supplies, means of living, and largely depended on Beirut’s port for imports and exports, and ideals to annex neighboring districts emerged. These neighboring regions that used to be under Shibabi rule together with Mount Lebanon desired to enjoy the similar rights to the Mutasarrifiyya. Keeping the Mutasarrifiyya and the effect it had on neighboring regions under control, in 1864, the Ottoman Empire decided to join the provinces of Damascus and Saida (the seat of which was Beirut) into one Province of Syria – uniting the districts bordering Mount Lebanon. In 1866 Mehmed Rashid Paşa was appointed governor of Syria. During his tenure he applied many reform measures to counterbalance the effect the establishment of the Mutasarrifiyya had on the region.  It was only after World War One that the French agreed to attach the adjacent districts to Mount Lebanon and constitute the State of Greater Lebanon. 
Restricted mainly to the mountains by the Mutasarrifiyya (district governed by a mutasarrif) arrangement and unable to make a living, many Lebanese Christians emigrated to Egypt and other parts of Africa and to North America, South America, and East Asia. Remittances from these Lebanese emigrants send to their relatives in Lebanon has continued to supplement the Lebanese economy to this day.

In addition to being a center of commercial and religious activity, Lebanon became an intellectual center in the second half of the nineteenth century. Foreign missionaries established schools throughout the country, with Beirut as the center of this renaissance. The American University of Beirut was founded in 1866, followed by the French St. Joseph's University in 1875. An intellectual guild that was formed at the same time gave new life to Arabic literature, which had stagnated under the Ottoman Empire. This new intellectual era was also marked by the appearance of numerous publications and by a highly prolific press.

The period was also marked by increased political activity. The harsh rule of Abdul Hamid II (1876–1909) prompted the Arab nationalists, both Christians and Muslims, in Beirut and Damascus to organize into clandestine political groups and parties. The Lebanese, however, had difficulties in deciding the best political course to advocate. Many Lebanese Christians were apprehensive of Turkish pan-Islamic policies, fearing a repetition of the 1860 massacres. Some, especially the Maronites, began to contemplate secession rather than the reform of the Ottoman Empire. Others, particularly the Greek Orthodox, advocated an independent Syria with Lebanon as a separate province within it, so as to avoid Maronite rule. A number of Lebanese Muslims, on the other hand, sought not to liberalize the Ottoman regime but to maintain it, as Sunni Muslims particularly liked to be identified with the caliphate. The Shias and Druzes, however, fearing minority status in a Turkish state, tended to favor an independent Lebanon or a continuation of the status quo.

Youssef Bey Karam, a Lebanese nationalist played an influential role in Lebanon's independence during this era.

Originally the Arab reformist groups hoped their nationalist aims would be supported by the Young Turks, who had staged a revolution in 1908–1909. Unfortunately, after seizing power, the Young Turks became increasingly repressive and nationalistic. They abandoned many of their liberal policies because of domestic opposition and Turkey's engagement in foreign wars between 1911 and 1913. Thus, the Arab nationalists could not count on the support of the Young Turks and instead were faced with opposition by the Turkish government.

Foreign intervention in the 19th century and changing economic conditions 

The tensions that burst into the sectarian conflict during the 1860s were set within the context of a fast-paced change in the established social order in the region. Under Bashir II, the agricultural economy of the Mount Lebanon region was brought into greater interdependence with the commercial economy of Beirut, altering the structure of feudal obligations and expanding the influence of cash crops. This created increased economic and political ties with France, leading to the French becoming an international patron of sorts to the Maronites of Lebanon.

The links that bind France and Lebanon date back centuries, and it's hard to ascertain when France first acted in Lebanon. Historians date this connection back to the first presence of French Jesuits on Mount Lebanon following their arrival in Syria in 1831. During the first part of the nineteenth century, exclusive Christian identity began to emerge on Mount Lebanon, and the Maronite church played a pivotal role in determining Lebanon's political history and the establishment of a Christian state in Lebanon in 1920. These Catholic communities ultimately established an extensive Jesuit education system in the area, with Université Saint Joseph serving as the first institution, founded in Beirut in 1875. The University exposed its students to a variety of academic subjects, which helped them develop a stronger sense of identity. To gain knowledge about their homeland, students at the University's Oriental Faculty studied archaeology, philology, and history. This long process has strengthened their national identity, and those same thinkers will later demand for the country's independence. The knowledge they received in those schools, as well as the elite that was developed as a result of it, spawned the first nationalist movement. Nujaym, an educated Maronite from Junie, one of the most influential of them, was arguing for the creation of a Greater Lebanon as an independent state. Nujaym's historical and geographical arguments on Lebanon had become a foundation for some intellectuals and politicians “national ambition". It had a direct impact on Lebanon by forming an elite that later governed the country by occupying most administrative and governmental positions, as well as working as a mediator between Lebanon and France, which was the country's mandatory authority at the time. They also contributed to the media by founding newspapers and magazines such as La revue Phénicienne in 1919, which went on to become one of Lebanon's most influential francophone publications.

This left the British to side with the Druze to the extent that a counterweight to France could be established in the region and that such tensions would not result in separatism that would threaten the integrity of the Ottoman Empire. The reforms within the Tanzimat also provided a source of increasing disagreement between Maronite and Druze populations. The European powers attempted to make sure the Tanzimat was interpreted as a mandate to protected Christians in the region and grant them great autonomy; while Druze elites interpreted the Tanzimat as restoring their traditional rights to rule the land. 

Foreign actions in Lebanon were dominated by European countries like as England, Germany, and France, although non-European powers such as Russia were also involved. Its their interaction with the Ottoman Empire that would lead them to operate in the Mount Lebanon .During the late end of the 19th century, the Ottoman Empire's economy was deteriorating, the government was forced to seek loans from European banks in order to pay off its obligations. However, the agreements were that they had to trade with Europeans compagnies and lets them control different field or part of their territory this including the mount Lebanon. The railroad trade is one illustration of European countries' worldwide expansion; It originally started in 1888 when the building of Anatolian Railway leading to Baghdad was granted to German developers. Later in 1889, German and French came to an agreement and decided to equally divide the ownership of that new railroad company. This project, also known as the Baghdad Railway, later opened the way for the French mandate. Therefore, in 1902 French firms were at the head of five railroad that ran throughout Greater Syria, which comprised Lebanon, Syria, Jordan, and Israel at the time. At the same time as the railroads were being built, the Turks acquired control of the Ottoman government and took on greater debt. This economic instability prompted them to sign a general agreement on April 9, 1914, in which France agreed to lend the Ottoman Empire 800 million francs in exchange for the Turkish signature over the concession granted to France in two prior agreements signed in September 1913. These concessions included the right to construct 1790 kilometers of new railways, as well as the restoration of all privileges granted to French charities and religious organizations in Syria and Lebanon. It strengthened the French legitimacy within the country and facilitated the creation of the French Mandate later.

World War I and the French Mandate 
The outbreak of World War I in August 1914 brought famine to Lebanon, mainly resulting from a Turkish land blockade and confiscations. It killed an estimated third to half of the predominantly Maronite population over the next four years.

Turkey, which had allied itself with Germany and Austria-Hungary, abolished Lebanon's semiautonomous status and appointed Djemal Pasha, then minister of the navy, as the commander in chief of the Turkish forces in Syria, with discretionary powers. For centuries the Turks had pursued a policy alienating the majority of the non-Turkish subjects of the Empire. The diverse people from the Syrian province had become more and more aware of their own identity as non-Turks. Now that the First World War broke out, these subjects would be willing to help the enemy, because of their lack of sympathy for the Turks. British and French forced affected a naval blockade of the Syrian coast, starting intelligence operations together with the French. By controlling the waters, Allies dropped and picked up spies, with the help of local shipmen facilitating the escape of spies by bringing them to the Allied warships. At night there as constant flashing of messages between the warships and spies on the coast. The intelligence operations were conducted in an obvious way, which pleased many locals, embarrassing the Turks.

Pasha pursued a harsh reign, executing dozens on grounds of political activity. This politically suppressive rule led to mass executions in Beirut and Damascus on 6 May 1916. Fourteen inhabitants from Beirut were hanged in the public square. Since the sectarian conflict of 1860, Lebanon had not seen such acts of violence as these. The mass executions created momentum and strengthened Arab nationalism, striving for Arab political independence.  The Turkish Army also cut down trees for wood to fuel trains or for military purposes. 6 May is a commemoration day known as Martyr's Day, Martyrs' Square in Beirut is named after this day.

The end of Ottoman rule in Lebanon began in September 1918 when French forces landed on the Lebanese coast, and the British moved into Palestine, opening the way for the liberation of Syria and Lebanon from Turkish rule. At the San Remo Conference in Italy in April 1920, the Allies gave France a mandate over Greater Syria. France then appointed General Henri Gouraud to implement the mandate provisions.

See also 
 Mount Lebanon Mutasarrifate
 Turks in Lebanon
 Maronite-Druze dualism

References